Sergei Valentinovich Zabolotnov (also Sergey, ; born 11 August 1963, is a former backstroke swimmer from the USSR.

Career 
In 1983, he set a European record in the 200 m backstroke. The time of 2:00.42 was achieved on 4 July 1983 at Edmonton, Canada, when winning a gold medal whilst competing in the World University Games. He set his second European record on 15 February 1984, recording 2:00.39 at the Soviet Winter Nationals.

After missing the 1984 Summer Olympic Games in Los Angeles of late July and early August due to the eastern bloc boycott, Zabolotnov competed at the Friendship Games in Moscow, USSR, winning the gold medal for the 200 m backstroke in a world record time of 1:58.41 on 21 August 1984. This time eclipsed the previous world record of 1:58.86 set by Rick Carey, USA on 27 June 1984 at the USA Olympic Swimming Trials. Rick Carey won the gold medal for the 200 m backstroke in Los Angeles in a time of 2:00.23, three weeks before Zabolotnov's world record swim. Carey recorded 1:58.99 in the preliminaries in Los Angeles for an Olympic record.

Zabolotnov competed at the 1988 Summer Olympic Games in Seoul, South Korea, in both the 100 and 200 m backstroke, finishing fourth in each. His time in the 100 m backstroke was 55.37. His time in the 200 m backstroke was 2:00.52. He competed in the preliminaries of the 4 × 100 m medley relay only but earned a bronze medal when the Soviet team finished behind the United States and Canadian teams in the final.

References

Uzbekistani male backstroke swimmers
Swimmers at the 1988 Summer Olympics
Living people
Sportspeople from Tashkent
World record setters in swimming
World Aquatics Championships medalists in swimming
European Aquatics Championships medalists in swimming
Medalists at the 1988 Summer Olympics
Olympic bronze medalists for the Soviet Union
Universiade medalists in swimming
1963 births
Universiade gold medalists for the Soviet Union
Universiade bronze medalists for the Soviet Union
Honoured Masters of Sport of the USSR
Medalists at the 1981 Summer Universiade
Medalists at the 1983 Summer Universiade
Medalists at the 1985 Summer Universiade
Soviet male backstroke swimmers